Gymnopilus fulgens is a species of mushroom in the family Hymenogastraceae. It was given its current name by mycologist Rolf Singer in 1951.

Description

Habitat and distribution
Gymnopilus fulgens grows among moss, on peaty soil, charred sphagnum, or burned-over soil. In the United States, it has been collected in Michigan, but it has also been found in Europe. It fruits from June to September.

See also

List of Gymnopilus species

References

External links
Gymnopilus fulgens at Index Fungorum

fulgens
Fungi of North America